Dedicated is the fourth studio album by Canadian singer Carly Rae Jepsen. It was released on May 17, 2019, by 604 Records in Canada, and School Boy and Interscope Records in the United States. The album was preceded by the release of the singles "Party for One", "Now That I Found You", "No Drug Like Me", "Julien", and "Too Much". To support the album Jepsen embarked on The Dedicated Tour with dates in Europe, North America and Asia. A companion album, Dedicated Side B, featuring outtakes from Dedicated, was released just over a year later on May 21, 2020.

The album received generally positive reviews and debuted at number 18 in the US, becoming her third top-twenty album. The album also peaked inside the top 20 in Jepsen's home country, at number 16 on the Canadian Albums Chart and at number 17 on the Scottish Albums Chart. Dedicated was named in many year-end lists of best albums of 2019.

Background 
In April 2016, Jepsen spoke to Stereogum that she was eager to work on new music, hoping to halve the production time consumed by her previous record. She cited a stroke of inspiration that wasn't apparent when development on her third studio album Emotion (2015) began, which ultimately took three years to produce as Jepsen sought creative control and an evolution in sound. She aimed to release new music by the next year.

Work on her fourth studio album commenced in June 2016, where she traveled to Sweden on the first of four trips. Frameworking the project was the notion of how music is consumed in her own life, "which is sometimes a little more homestyle, dance parties in the living room with your friends." Her relationship with photographer David Larkins came to an end during the same trip, which prompted Jepsen to explore the melancholy that pervaded her life:"I think the album goes through that process of like, 'Shit, what do I do now?' And, at the same time, singlehood for the first time in a while, which I'm kind of new at! So there was an arc of like, full-on heartbreak to a new story. I think I do pull a lot of inspiration from the complexities of relationships in all of its phases. It was a real painful thing in my life, but a real helpful thing for being inspired."Jepsen described producer John Hill, whom she met further along in the process, as being a "hero on this project, in terms of his production seeming really fresh to me and kind of dark in their tastes, and so it was fun to have these falsetto, almost more soft toplines on top of the dark production." Other contributors to the album include Jack Antonoff, Noonie Bao, Pontus Winnberg of Bloodshy & Avant and Captain Cuts. Early in development, Jepsen was particularly looking forward to meeting Patrik Berger, being a fan of his work on Swedish singer Robyn's 2010 single "Dancing On My Own".

Writing and development 
Under the working title of Music to Clean Your House To, Jepsen conceived the album as "an understated disco, living room dance party thing", an inclination that arose from digging into ABBA's back catalogue. These influences from the '70s era, namely Donna Summer and the Bee Gees, were channeled into an incarnation of the project titled Disco Sweat. It was shelved as Berger advised her against working too rigidly, Jepsen expressing, "You might be shooting yourself in the foot and limiting where you can go." She further explained:"When I showed up with that mission statement that was so pigeonholed, it really wasn't helping the writing process. It was fun to get a few songs that landed naturally in that zone — I think 'Julien' was the most understated disco song that made the album — but I think it was Patrik [Berger] who said, 'It'll be much more fun if you just allow yourself to play in all directions.' I knew at that time that I was gonna take a beat with this thing, so it felt like the right move to just experiment."

By May 2019, Jepsen had written "nearly 200 songs" for the album.

Music and lyrics
Dedicated is a "collection of forward-thinking" pop, electropop, synth-pop, disco and dance-pop songs inspired by music from the 1980s and 1990s with elements of house and R&B. Its lyrics span themes of "crushing hard, having anxiety about a new relationship, experiencing true lovesickness, breaking up, and finally coming to terms with being alone".

Promotion
"Party for One" was released as the lead single on November 1, 2018. On February 27, 2019, "Now That I Found You" and "No Drug Like Me" were issued as a double A-side single. "Now That I Found You" was written at a writing camp in Nicaragua. A music video for "Now That I Found You" was released on March 14, 2019. On March 31, 2019, Jepsen teased an upcoming announcement on her social media accounts. On April 1, 2019, the title and release date for Dedicated were announced, along with US dates for The Dedicated Tour. On April 17, 2019, Jepsen revealed the album's track listing and cover. The album was made available to pre-order on April 19, 2019, along with the fourth single "Julien". "Julien" was written at Maderas Village, Nicaragua in August 2016.

"Too Much" was released as the album's fifth and final single on May 9, 2019. Its music video was released on May 17, 2019. On June 28, Jepsen released a Mansionair remix of "No Drug Like Me" as a promotional single to mark the launch of the North American leg of The Dedicated Tour. On September 19, 2019, a video for the album's fourth track, "Want You in My Room", was uploaded to Jepsen's YouTube channel. A live version of the song recorded at Electric Lady Studios in New York City was released as a single on October 2, 2019, exclusively on Spotify alongside a cover of No Doubt's "Don't Speak" as a B-side. On October 18, 2019, a live video for the album's ninth track, "The Sound", was uploaded to YouTube. Jepsen and the band performed on a dock in a lake in Finland. MTV called the performance "adorably autumnal and simply sublime". The recording was also released on digital retailers as a promotional single.

Critical reception

Dedicated received generally positive reviews from music critics; aggregating website Metacritic reports a normalized rating of 79, based on 22 critical reviews, indicating "generally favorable reviews".

Reviewing the album for AllMusic, Heather Phares gave a rating of four and a half stars out of five, writing that "Jepsen is just as committed to her music as she is to the ideal of true love, and the way she's grown without sacrificing her uniqueness makes Dedicated a master class in what a 2010s pop album can be." Laura Snapes of The Guardian gave a rating of four stars out of five, stating that "[Jepsen] belts less, but leaves a stronger impression: swooning into the gently funky 'Julien'; seductively in control on the looser 'No Drug Like Me'; cheeky as Cyndi Lauper on 'Want You in My Room'." Giving a rating of four stars out of five, Elisa Bray of The Independent describes Dedicated as "an album of polished pop" that "perhaps... will put [Jepsen] at the top where she belongs."

Year-end lists

Commercial performance
Dedicated debuted at number 16 in Canada. The album debuted at number 18 on the US Billboard 200. In the UK, it debuted at number 26. In Japan, the album debuted at number 28.

Track listing

"Everything He Needs" contains portions of "He Needs Me" by Harry Nilsson
 signifies an additional producer
 signifies a co-producer
 signifies a producer and vocal producer
 signifies a vocal producer

Personnel
Credits taken from the album's liner notes.

Performance

Carly Rae Jepsen – lead vocals (all tracks), background vocals (track 15)
Kyle Shearer – instruments (track 1)
Nate Cyphert – background vocals (track 1)
John Hill – guitar (track 2, 6-8, 11), keyboards (track 2, 6, 8, 10-11), synth (track 6-8), drums (track 6-8), percussion (track 6, 8), bass (track 6, 8, 11), programming (track 6-8, 10), horns (track 11)
Jordan Palmer – guitar (track 2, 6, 8), keyboards (track 2, 6, 8, 11), bass (track 2, 6, 8), drums (track 2, 6, 8, 11), synthesizer (track 2, 6, 8), percussion (track 6, 8), programming (track 6, 8, 11)
Captain Cuts – background vocals (track 3), keyboards, drums, programming, instrumentation (track 15)
Jack Antonoff – instruments, programming (track 4)
Ben Romans – keys (track 5)
Amanda Warner – bass (track 5)
CJ Baran – programming (track 5)
Patrik Berger – bass, guitar, drums (track 7), instruments, programming (track 14)
James King – saxophone (track 7)
Noah Beresin – piano (track 9)
Rogét Chahayed – bass (track 10), keyboards (track 10, 12), programming (track 12)
Electric Guest – featured vocals, piano, keyboards, percussion, guitar (track 11)
Alex Hope – programming, keyboards (track 12)
James Flannigan – programming (track 13)
Koz Alxndr – additional programming (track 13)
Jim Alxndr – additional programming, saxophone (track 13)
Noonie Bao – background vocals (track 14)
Pontus Winnberg – instruments, programming (track 14)
Julia Karlsson – background vocals (track 15)
Hightower – keyboards, drums, programming, instrumentation (track 15)

Technical

Kyle Shearer – production (track 1)
Serban Ghenea – mixing (tracks 1-4, 14-15)
John Hanes – engineering (tracks 1-4, 14-15)
Gene Grimaldi – mastering (tracks 1, 4-6, 8-9, 11-14)
John Hill – production (tracks 2, 6-8, 10-11)
Jordan Palmer – production (tracks 2, 6, 11), vocal production (tracks 6, 11), co-producer (track 8)
Rob Cohen – engineering (tracks 2, 6-8, 10), vocal production (tracks 7-8, 10)
Chris Gehringer – mastering (tracks 2, 7, 10)
Captain Cuts – production (tracks 3, 15), engineering (track 3), arrangement (track 15)
ayokay – additional production (track 3)
Dave Kutch – mastering (track 3)
Jack Antonoff – production (track 4)
Laura Sisk – engineering (track 4)
Mitch McCarthy – mixing (tracks 5, 11)
CJ Baran – engineering (track 5)
Jon Castelli – mixing (tracks 6-8, 10)
Ingmar Carlson – engineering for mix (tracks 6-8, 10)
Blake Mares – engineering (tracks 6-8, 10-11)
Patrik Berger – production (tracks 7, 14)
English Breakfast – production (track 9)
Tony Maserati – mixing (track 9)
Miles Comaskey – assistant mix engineering (track 9)
Rogét Chahayed – production (tracks 10, 12)
Asa Taccone – production (track 11)
Alex Hope – production (track 12), vocal production (track 12)
Josh Gudwin – mixing (track 12)
Elijah Merritt-Hitch – assistant mixing (track 12)
James Flannigan (songwriter) – production (track 13), vocal production (track 13)
Koz Alxndr – additional production (track 13)
Jim Alxndr – additional production (track 13)
Daniel Zaidenstadt – vocal production (track 13)
Pontus Winnberg – production (track 14)
Hightower – production, arrangement (track 15)
Julia Karlsson – vocal production (track 15)

Charts

Release history

References

2019 albums
604 Records albums
Albums produced by Asa Taccone
Albums produced by Bloodshy & Avant
Albums produced by Jack Antonoff
Albums produced by John Hill (record producer)
Albums produced by Stephen Kozmeniuk
Carly Rae Jepsen albums
Interscope Records albums
Schoolboy Records albums
Albums produced by Alex Hope (songwriter)
Disco albums by Canadian artists
Dance-pop albums by Canadian artists
Synth-pop albums by Canadian artists